José Vivanco (born 22 February 1998) is an Argentine professional footballer who plays as a centre-back for Ierapetra.

Career
Vivanco's career began in the system of Jorge Newbery de Patagones, prior to spells with River Plate and, in 2018, San Lorenzo. He first appeared in Jorge Almirón's first-team during the following December, when he was selected as a substitute for an Argentine Primera División draw away to Aldosivi; he was subbed on after sixty-nine minutes for Marcelo Herrera, making his professional bow at the age of twenty.

In February 2022, Vivanco joined Greek club Ierapetra.

Career statistics
.

References

External links

1998 births
Living people
People from Viedma
Argentine footballers
Argentine expatriate footballers
Association football defenders
Argentine Primera División players
Primera Nacional players
Super League Greece 2 players
San Lorenzo de Almagro footballers
Club Atlético Temperley footballers
O.F. Ierapetra F.C. players
Argentine expatriate sportspeople in Greece
Expatriate footballers in Greece